Live at Red Rocks may refer to:

Live at Red Rocks (video), a 1986 DVD by Stevie Nicks
Live at Red Rocks (John Tesh album) (1995), live album and video
Live at Red Rocks 8.15.95 (1997), live album by Dave Matthews Band
Live at Red Rocks, a DVD by Rickie Lee Jones filmed in 1990 and released in 2001
Live at Red Rocks (The John Butler Trio album) (2010)
U2 Live at Red Rocks: Under a Blood Red Sky (1983), live video by U2
Alive at Red Rocks (2004), live video by Incubus
Live at Red Rocks (2016), live album by Rebelution
Live at Red Rocks (2016), live album by alt-J
Live at Red Rocks (2018), see Bad Company discography
 Live at Red Rocks Amphitheatre, 2018 live album by Australian musician Vance Joy
Live at Red Rocks ‘22 (2022), live album by King Gizzard & the Lizard Wizard